Joseph Stretch Crowther (1820–1893), usually known as J. S. Crowther, was an English architect who practised in Manchester.

Crowther studied under Richard Tattersall from 1838–1843.  He worked as a managing clerk for Henry Bowman until 1846, when Bowman took him into partnership, the firm being known as Bowman and Crowther.

Crowther then went into independent practice, designing churches in Gothic Revival style, and villas in a variety of styles.  He was appointed as the diocesan architect for Manchester Cathedral, and was working on the restoration of the cathedral at the time of his death, which occurred in March 1893.

Key

Works

References

Sources

External links

Architecture in England
Church architecture
Gothic Revival architecture in England
Lists of buildings and structures in England
Crowther J. S.